Weston Priory is a community of Benedictine monks who reside in Weston, Vermont, founded in 1953. The Priory is within the confines of the Roman Catholic Diocese of Burlington, which encompasses the entirety of Vermont. They are particularly known for the songs they have contributed to Roman Catholic worship over the past 50 years, their connection to Latin America, and the crafts produced at the monastery.

History and mission
Weston Priory was founded by Abbot Leo A. Rudloff of Dormition Abbey in Jerusalem in 1953. He had the intention that some of those trained in Vermont would later assist the Community at Dormition Abbey in Jerusalem. Abbot Leo also expressed the hope that the Priory would become a Community in its own right in the movement of monastic renewal. Today, the community is an Independent or Conventual Priory. At the beginning, Abbot Leo considered locating the Priory in Pennsylvania or a few other places, but the presence of other religious houses in those places required that he look elsewhere. With the help of Benedictine Oblates Leon and Dorothea Smith, he located a suitable site in the Green Mountains of Vermont. 

The original building was an old abandoned farmhouse with an attached barn, a few miles from the village of Weston. The attached barn had been partially burned and was renovated to become the chapel. Abbot Leo engaged Architects and Builders, a Weston group to renovate the barn-chapel. The main house became the monastery kitchen, dining room, library, and tiny gift shop on the ground floor. Four small separate rooms and the Prior's room occupied the second floor. A dilapidated chicken house behind the main house was renovated to become classroom, recreation room and dormitory for novices. This latter building was heated by a small wood stove and fireplace and had indoor plumbing.

In a small book titled The Silent Life, published in 1957 Thomas Merton refers to Weston Priory as a new Benedictine foundation of "the Primitive Observance". The priory was in fact one of several North American monasteries in the renewal movement that preceded Vatican Council II. Thomas Merton considered the community to be one of only a handful that was dedicated to Benedictine renewal, including the rediscovery of "choir monks," educated monks who prayed the full Liturgy of the Hours, yet not being priests. Founded on the Bible and the Benedictine Rule, the Weston community became increasingly dedicated to the peace and social justice movements. The abbey bonded with a group of Benedictine nuns in Mexico, establishing a retreat Center in Cuernavaca to raise consciousness among North Americans of their southern neighbors. Through the monastery's relationships with senators Patrick Leahy and Bernie Sanders, they have tried to bring more attention to the plight of the poor in Mexico. The Priory was, in the 1980s, one of several hundred churches and religious organizations that pledged to provide for refugees seeking homes in the United States.

Music and artwork
In the 1960s, the brothers of Weston Priory began writing their own music for use in their community prayer, a central feature of monastic life. They composed much of the music they use when they pray the monastic office and celebrate liturgy. Their music is well known throughout the world, as it has become popular Catholic liturgical worship music.

The monks maintain gardens, livestock, and a book store that includes ceramics, woodwork, calligraphy, candles and other items produced by the brothers. Several pieces of the pottery produced at the monastery are held by museums, such as the Museum of Fine Arts in Boston.

Notable members
The most remembered and outstanding brother in the Weston Priory Community was, without doubt, Abbot Leo Rudloff. With the confidence of Pope John XXIII, Abbot Leo, at that time Abbot of Dormition Abbey in Jerusalem was named to the pre-Vatican Council Commission that included the quest for reconciliation between Christians and Jews. His work preceding the Council was focused on the Council Document Nostra Aetate which began a new era of cooperation between Christians and Jews. When he retired as Abbot In Jerusalem, the abbot journeyed to his foundation in Weston and was known as brother Leo. Other well-known community members have included ceramic artist Brother Thomas (Thomas Bezanson) and Gregory Norbet, the composer of much of the community's earlier music. Author Tomie DePaola was briefly a member in 1956.

Awards 
In July 1992, the Weston Priory Community was awarded the Peace Abbey Courage of Conscience Award in Sherborn, Massachusetts, for its reception of the Guatemalan Refugee family, Elena and Felipe Ixcot and their five children.

See also
 Contemporary Catholic liturgical music

References

External links
 Weston Priory
 Gregory Norbet

Buildings and structures in Weston, Vermont
Contemporary Catholic liturgical music
Benedictine monasteries in the United States
Christian organizations established in 1953
Tourist attractions in Windsor County, Vermont